Clarence Malcolm Lowry (28 July 1909 – 26 June 1957) was an English poet and novelist who is best known for his 1947 novel Under the Volcano, which was voted No. 11 in the Modern Library 100 Best Novels list.

Biography

Early years in England
Lowry was born in New Brighton, Wirral, the fourth son of Evelyn Boden and Arthur Lowry, a cotton broker with roots in Cumberland. In 1912, the family moved to Caldy, on another part of the Wirral peninsula. Their home was a mock Tudor estate on two acres with a tennis court, small golf course and a maid, a cook and a nanny. Lowry was said to have felt neglected by his mother, and was closest to his brother. He began drinking alcohol at the age of 14.

In his teens Lowry was a boarder at The Leys School in Cambridge, the school made famous by the novel Goodbye, Mr. Chips. At age 15, he won the junior golf championship at the Royal Liverpool Golf Club, Hoylake.  His father expected him to go to Cambridge and enter the family business, but Malcolm wanted to experience the world and convinced his father to let him work as a deckhand on a tramp steamer to the Far East.  In May 1927, his parents drove him to the Liverpool waterfront and, while the local press watched, waved goodbye as he set sail on the freighter S.S. Pyrrhus. The five months at sea gave him stories to incorporate into his first novel, Ultramarine.

After returning to Britain Lowry enrolled at St Catharine's College, Cambridge in autumn 1929, in an attempt to placate his parents. He spent little time at the university, but excelled in writing, graduating in 1931 with a 3rd class honours degree in English.  During his first term, his roommate, Paul Fitte, killed himself. Fitte had wanted a homosexual relationship, which Lowry refused.  Lowry felt responsible for his death and was haunted by it for the rest of his life. Lowry was already well travelled; besides his sailing experience, between terms he made visits to America, to befriend his literary idol, Conrad Aiken, and to Germany.

After Cambridge, Lowry lived briefly in London, existing on the fringes of the vibrant Thirties literary scene and meeting Dylan Thomas. He met his first wife, Jan Gabrial, in Spain.  They were married in France in 1934. Theirs was a turbulent union, especially due to his drinking, and because she resented homosexuals attracted to her husband.

United States, Mexico, Canada
After an estrangement, Lowry followed Jan to New York City where, almost incoherent after an alcohol-induced breakdown, he checked into Bellevue Psychiatric Hospital in 1936 – experiences which later became the basis of his novella Lunar Caustic.  When the authorities began to take notice of him, he fled to avoid deportation and then went to Hollywood, where he tried screenwriting.  At about that time he began writing Under the Volcano. Lowry and Jan moved to Mexico, arriving in the city of Cuernavaca on 2 November 1936, the Day of the Dead, in a final attempt to salvage their marriage. Lowry continued to drink heavily though he also devoted more energy to his writing.

The effort to save their marriage failed.  Jan saw that he wanted a mother figure, and she did not want to mother him. She then ran off with another man in late 1937. Alone in Oaxaca, Lowry entered into another period of dark alcoholic excess, culminating in his deportation from Mexico in the summer of 1938.  His family put him up at the Hotel Normandie in Los Angeles where he continued working on his novel and met his second wife, the actress and writer Margerie Bonner. His father sent his rent checks directly to the Normandie's hotel manager.

In August Lowry moved to Vancouver, British Columbia, Canada, leaving his manuscript behind. Later, Margerie moved up to Vancouver, bringing his manuscript, and the following year they married. At first, they lived in an attic apartment in the city.  When World War II broke out, Lowry tried to enlist but was rejected. Correspondence between Lowry and Canada's Governor-General Lord Tweedsmuir (who was better known as the writer John Buchan) during this time resulted in Lowry's writing several articles for the Vancouver Province newspaper. The couple lived and wrote in a squatter's shack on the beach near the community of Dollarton, North Vancouver, north of Vancouver. In 1944, the beach shack was destroyed by a fire, and Lowry was injured in his efforts to save manuscripts. Margerie was an entirely positive influence, editing Lowry's work skillfully and making sure that he ate as well as drank (she drank, too). The couple traveled to Europe, America and the Caribbean, and while Lowry continued to drink heavily, this seems to have been a relatively peaceful and productive period. It lasted until 1954, when a final nomadic period ensued, embracing New York, London and other places. During their travels to Europe, Lowry twice attempted to strangle Margerie.

He lived in Canada for much of his active writing career and is thus also considered a significant figure in Canadian literature. He won the Governor General's Award for English-language fiction in 1961 for his posthumous collection Hear Us O Lord from Heaven Thy Dwelling Place.

Death

Lowry died in June 1957, in a rented cottage in the village of Ripe, Sussex, where he was living with wife Margerie after having returned to England in 1955, ill and impoverished. The coroner's verdict was death by misadventure, and the causes of death given as inhalation of stomach contents, barbiturate poisoning, and excessive consumption of alcohol.

It has been suggested that his death was a suicide. Inconsistencies in the accounts given by his wife at various times about what happened on the night of his death have also given rise to suspicions of murder.

Lowry is buried in the churchyard of St John the Baptist in Ripe. Lowry reputedly wrote his own epitaph: "Here lies Malcolm Lowry, late of the Bowery, whose prose was flowery, and often glowery. He lived nightly, and drank daily, and died playing the ukulele," but the epitaph does not appear on his gravestone.

Legacy 
In 2017 the British Library acquired Malcolm Lowry papers from his first wife Jan Gabrial. Lowry's literary papers had been left in the possession of Gabrial's mother, Emily Vanderheim, in 1936 and passed to Gabrial on her mother's death. Some further items were then acquired from Priscilla Bonner, the sister of Margerie Bonner Lowry. The archive contains literary papers of Lowry; personal papers of Jan Gabrial, primarily relating to her marriage to Lowry; and select items relating to Margerie Bonner Lowry, Lowry's second wife.

Writings
Lowry published little during his lifetime, in comparison with the extensive collection of unfinished manuscripts he left. Of his two novels, Under the Volcano (1947) is now widely accepted as his masterpiece and one of the great works of the 20th century (number 11 on the Modern Library's 100 Best Novels of the 20th century).

Ultramarine (1933), written while Lowry was still an undergraduate, follows a young man's first sea voyage and his determination to gain the crew's acceptance.

A collection of short stories, Hear Us, O Lord from Heaven Thy Dwelling Place (1961), was published after Lowry's death. The scholar and poet Earle Birney edited Selected Poems of Malcolm Lowry (1962). Birney also collaborated with Lowry's widow in editing the novella Lunar Caustic (1968) for re-publication. It is a conflation of several earlier pieces concerned with Bellevue Hospital, which Lowry was in the process of rewriting as a complete novel. With Douglas Day, Lowry's first biographer, Lowry's widow also completed and edited the novels Dark as the Grave Wherein my Friend Is Laid (1968) and October Ferry to Gabriola (1970) from Lowry's manuscripts.

The Selected Letters of Malcolm Lowry, edited by his widow and Harvey Breit, was released in 1965, followed in 1995–96 by the two-volume Sursum Corda! The Collected Letters of Malcolm Lowry, edited by Sherrill E. Grace. Scholarly editions of Lowry's final work in progress, La Mordida ("The Bribe"), and his screen adaptation of F. Scott Fitzgerald's Tender Is the Night have also been published.

Volcano: An Inquiry into the Life and Death of Malcolm Lowry (1976) is an Oscar-nominated National Film Board of Canada documentary directed by Donald Brittain and John Kramer. It opens with the inquest into Lowry's "death by misadventure", and then moves back in time to trace the writer's life. Selections from Lowry's novel are read by Richard Burton amid images shot in Mexico, the United States, Canada and England.

In 2001, Lowry's first wife Jan Gabrial revealed in her memoir that she had an early draft of Lowry's novel In Ballast to the White Sea, which was thought to have been lost. According to Professor Dean Irvine at Dalhousie University, Lowry had given an early copy of the novel to Gabrial's mother before the couple went to Mexico in 1936. Lowry's working copy of the manuscript was then lost in a fire. In October 2014 it was published for the first time by University of Ottawa Press and a launch was held at the Bluecoat Arts Centre in Liverpool.

The Voyage That Never Ends
Lowry envisioned The Voyage That Never Ends as his magnum opus: an epic cycle encompassing his existing novels and stories as well as projected works, with Under the Volcano as its centrepiece. He spent much of his writing life crafting his body of work into a greater, thematically cohesive whole, which he called The Voyage That Never Ends. It was to rival the epics of other great modernists, and he referred to it in several personal annotations and letters as the concept evolved over many years and works-in-progress. An early typescript has the sequence's contents listed as:
 The Ordeal of Sigbjorn Wilderness I
–
 Untitled Sea Novel
 Lunar Caustic
–
 Under the Volcano
–
 Dark as the Grave Wherein My Friend is Laid
 Eridanus
 La Mordida
–
 The Ordeal of Sigbjorn Wilderness II

Lowry labelled Under the Volcano as "The Centre" while marking Dark as the Grave Wherein My Friend is Laid, Eridanus, and La Mordida as "Trilogy". In addition, Eridanus (the name Lowry gave his West Coast surroundings, referring "to both the stellar constellation and mythical river to which Faeton was cast down by gods") seems to consist of the story collection Hear Us Oh Lord From Heaven Thy Dwelling Place, the poems of The Lighthouse Invites the Storm, and "other tales, poems, a play, etc." As well, The Ordeal of Sigbjorn Wilderness was a novel he planned after spending time in a hospital after breaking his leg in 1949: "His experiences there due to a mixture of alcohol withdrawal and drugs were as traumatic as his time in Bellevue in 1936. As ever Malc turned these experiences into literature which he initially entitled the 'Atomic Rhythm' which eventually became The Ordeal of Sigbjørn Wilderness, which was never developed beyond a rough sketch and remains unpublished." His plans for The Voyage That Never Ends ultimately grew into a 34-page outline that he gave to the editor Albert Erskine, with whom he was friends.

It was this letter and outline that secured for Lowry a long-term contract with Random House. Lowry's alcoholism and early death, however, prevented him from finishing his grand project. Several of the works intended as part of the sequence were rewritten many times over many years—he worked on Lunar Caustic, for instance, from the 1930s until his death, first titled The Last Address, then Swinging the Maelstrom, and finally Lunar Caustic. The posthumous publications of his unfinished manuscripts have brought several more parts of The Voyage That Never Ends to light, though these vary in completeness and Lowry's final intentions with these works can only be speculated on. The published version of Lunar Caustic, for instance, was compiled by his widow Margerie Lowry and poet Earle Birney from "two distinctly different manuscripts. One bore the first title and was last worked on in 1942–44, while the other had the second name and was last edited by the (at the time living) dead author in 1951–52." In the intervening years, the story had undergone vast changes in style and thematic emphasis. A scholarly edition was eventually published in 2013 that includes the three major versions with annotation on the history of the text's composition. When the novel In Ballast to the White Sea was finally published in 2014—after being thought lost for decades—it represented only an early draft of the 1000 page manuscript that had been destroyed in the same shack fire that nearly destroyed Under the Volcano, and as such does not represent the more complete text Lowry had been working on for nine years. La Mordida was inspired by Lowry's deportation from Mexico in the mid-1940s. "The central narrative of La Mordida involves a descent into the abyss of self, culminating in the protagonist's symbolic rebirth at the book's end. Lowry planned to use this basic narrative pattern as the springboard for innumerable questions about such concerns as art, identity, the nature of existence, political issues, and alcoholism. Above all, La Mordida was to have been a metafictional work about an author who sees no point in living events if he cannot write about them and who is not only unable to write but suspects that he is just a character in a novel." It was published in 1996 as notes, sketches, outlines, and rough chapters—it was to feature the autobiographical character Sigbjorn Wilderness. Dark as the Grave Wherein My Friend is Laid was published only twelve years after Lowry's death, and also featured Sigbjorn Wilderness. It was "collated from a huge volume of notes ... almost every chapter exist[ing] in three or four different forms."

Because so much of The Voyage That Never Ends was left incomplete (much of it hardly begun, barely going beyond his initial conceptual framework) what exists only hints at the final form Lowry intended for his magnum opus.

Works
 Ultramarine (1933), novel; published by Jonathan Cape
 Under the Volcano (1947), novel; made into a film by John Huston in 1984

Posthumous
 Hear Us O Lord from Heaven Thy Dwelling Place (1961), short story collection
 Selected Poems of Malcolm Lowry (1962)
 Lunar Caustic (1963), novella, French language edition preceding by five years the English edition
 Lunar Caustic (1968), novella
 Dark as the Grave Wherein My Friend Is Laid (1968), novel
 October Ferry to Gabriola (1970), novel
 The Cinema of Malcolm Lowry: A Scholarly Edition of Malcolm Lowry's "Tender is the Night" edited by Miquel Mota & Paul Tiessen (1990)
 The 1940 Under The Volcano (1994), novel
 La Mordida edited by Patrick A. McCarthy (1996), novel
 In Ballast to the White Sea (2014), novel; Edited by Patrick A. McCarthy, Notes by Chris Ackerley, Foreword by Vik Doyen, University of Ottawa Press, 
 Selected Poems of Malcolm Lowry -City Lights Publishers (2017)

References

Sources
 Asals, Frederick, The making of Malcolm Lowry's Under the volcano (University of Georgia: Athens, 1997)
 Bareham, Tony, Modern Novelists: Malcolm Lowry (St Martins: New York, 1989)
 Bowker, Gordon, ed, Malcolm Lowry Remembered (Ariel: London, 1985)
 Bradbrook, M.C., Malcolm Lowry: His Art and Early Life (CUP: Cambridge, 1974)
 Cross, Richard K., Malcolm Lowry: a preface to his fiction (Athlone Press: London, 1980)
 Foxcroft, Nigel H., The Kaleidoscopic Vision of Malcolm Lowry: Souls and Shamans (Lexington Books: Lanham, MD, 2019). 
 Hochschild, Adam, Finding the Trapdoor: Essays, Portraits, Travels, pp. 265–73, "The Private Volcano of Malcolm Lowry," (Syracuse University Press: Syracuse, 1997)
 McCarthy, Patrick A., Forests of Symbols: World, Text, and Self in Malcolm Lowry's Fiction (Athens: Univ. of Georgia Press, 1994). . Paperback edition with new preface, Univ. of Georgia Press, 2016. .
 Miller, David, Malcolm Lowry and the voyage that never ends (Enitharmon Press: London, 1976)
 Smith, Anne, The art of Malcolm Lowry (Vision: London, 1978)
 Stevenson, Randall, The British Novel Since the Thirties (Batsford: London, 1986)
 Vice, Sue, Malcolm Lowry eighty years on (St. Martins Press: New York, 1989)
 Woolmer, J. Howard, Malcolm Lowry: a bibliography (Woolmer/Brotherson: Pennsylvania, 1983)

Further reading

General
 An Anthology from X (Oxford University Press 1988). X ran from 1959 to 1962. Edited by David Wright & Patrick Swift. Contributions from Lowry, W.H. Auden, Samuel Beckett, Alberto Giacometti, Francis Bacon (painter), Stevie Smith, Robert Graves, David Gascoyne, et al.
 The Cinema of Malcolm Lowry: A Scholarly Edition of Lowry's 'Tender Is the Night''' edited with an introduction by Miguel Mota and Paul Tiessen
 The Collected Poetry of Malcolm Lowry (1992) edited by Kathleen Scherf
 The Kaleidoscopic Vision of Malcolm Lowry: Souls and Shamans (2019) Nigel H. Foxcroft, Lexington Books: Lanham, MD.   and 
 Sursum Corda!: The Collected Letters of Malcolm Lowry, Volume I: 1926–1946 (1995) edited by Sherrill Grace
 Sursum Corda!: The Collected Letters of Malcolm Lowry, Volume II: 1947–1957 (1996) edited by Sherrill Grace
 The Voyage That Never Ends (2007), selected stories, poems, and letters; edited by Michael Hofmann
 Strange Comfort: Essays on the Work of Malcolm Lowry (2009) Sherill Grace and Richard Lane, Talonbooks: Vancouver, B.C. 
 Malcolm Lowry from the Mersey to the World (2009) edited by Bryan Biggs and Helen Tookey
 Malcolm Lowry's Volcano: Myth, Symbol, Meaning (1978) by David Markson

Biography
 Lowry, a Biography, Douglas Day (1973)
 Volcano: An Inquiry into the Life and Death of Malcolm Lowry - 1976 Canadian documentary film
 Malcolm Lowry Remembered, G. Bowker, ed (1985)
 Pursued by Furies: A Life of Malcolm Lowry, G. Bowker (1993)
 Inside the Volcano: My Life with Malcolm Lowry'', Jan Gabrial (2000)

External links

 
 
 

1909 births
1957 deaths
20th-century British male writers
20th-century British novelists
20th-century British poets
20th-century Canadian male writers
20th-century Canadian novelists
20th-century Canadian poets
Alcohol-related deaths in England
Alumni of St Catharine's College, Cambridge
Barbiturates-related deaths
British emigrants to Canada
British expatriates in Mexico
British male novelists
British male poets
Canadian male novelists
Canadian male poets
Drug-related deaths in England
Governor General's Award-winning fiction writers
Modernist writers
People educated at The Leys School
People from Birkenhead
People from Chalvington with Ripe